Mufti Tariq Masood, ; born 4 March 1975) is a Pakistani Deobandi author and Islamic scholar, who teaches at the Jamia Tur Rasheed seminary in Karachi. He has authored many books including Aik se Za'id Shadiyoon ki Zaroorat Kyu.

Personal life
Tariq Masood was born on 4 March 1975 to an ethnic Muhajir religious family in Sargodha. He married thrice: first in 2005, second in 2008 and the third time in 2018.<ref name="Samaa"

Career
Masood follows the Deobandi movement of Hanafism. He is a lecturer at the Jamia Tur Rasheed in Karachi. Tariq Masood has authored several books including Aik se Za'id Shadiyoon ki Zaroorat Kyu (Why the need for polygamy) and Family Planning.

Views

Standing up to China 
In July 2019 Masood learned that some Chinese companies in Pakistan did not allow Muslim employees to perform daily obligatory prayers during working hours. Masood urged employees to tell their Chinese employers that "they'll have to follow local laws and the country does not belong to them." Masood said, "People are afraid that they will lose their jobs." An old video of Masood saying this surfaced on social media on 26 June 2020.

COVID-19 
During the COVID-19 pandemic in Pakistan, the Government of Sindh announced a lockdown on 22 March 2020. Muhammad Taqi Usmani (of Jamia Darul Uloom, Karachi) announced on 25 March 2020 that people should still congregate for prayers except for those over fifty, young children and people with COVID-19 symptoms.

Masood disagreed with Usmani by supporting a ban on congregational prayers. Masood said: "We still don't understand the intensity of this virus. You can pray at home during this time and ask Allah for forgiveness and health."

On 7 April 2020, Masood took part in a BOL Entertainment programme to give people religious advice on COVID-19.

See also
Tariq Jamil

External links

References

1975 births
Living people
Pakistani YouTubers
20th-century Muslims
21st-century Muslims
People from Karachi
Pakistani Sunni Muslim scholars of Islam
Muslim missionaries
Critics of Ahmadiyya
Jamia Tur Rasheed people
Deobandis
Muhajir people
21st-century Muslim scholars of Islam